Joel Rufino dos Santos (1941 – 4 September 2015) was a Brazilian writer and historian. He was born in 1941 in Rio de Janeiro. He was a professor at the Federal University of Rio de Janeiro, he is considered one of the country's greatest historians as well as a novelist and writer, having been one of the leading names in the study of African culture and Afro-Brazilian literature in Brazil. He died from complications from cardiac surgery on 4 September 2015.

References

External links 
 Official homepage
 Books by Joel Rufino dos Santos
 Joel Rufino Dos Santos: Brazil ⋆ Author
 Joel Rufino dos Santos Biography and Filmography

1941 births
2015 deaths
Brazilian male poets
20th-century Brazilian historians
20th-century Brazilian male writers
20th-century Brazilian poets